The Poland national under-21 speedway team is the national under-21 motorcycle speedway team of Poland and is controlled by the Polish Motor Union (PZM). The Under-21 Speedway World Cup has been dominated by Poland with them winning first place in all of the past championships. Karol Ząbik was a member of Poland team by three finals (2005-2007). Poland has produced seven Under-21 Individual World Champions: Piotr Protasiewicz (1996), Robert Dados (1998), Dawid Kujawa (2001), Jarosław Hampel (2003), Robert Miśkowiak (2004), Krzysztof Kasprzak (2005) and Karol Ząbik (2006).

Competition

Team B

See also 
 Speedway in Poland
 Poland national speedway team
 Poland national under-19 speedway team

External links 
 (pl) Poland national team webside

National speedway teams
Speedway

!